

Geisspfadsee is a lake in Valais, Switzerland. The lake is located in the municipality of Binn, at an elevation of 2439 m. It drains into Züesee (2420 m). The nearby border to Italy can be crossed at two mountain passes: Geisspfadpass (Passo della Rossa) and Grampielpass (Passo di Crampiolo). The name 'geisspfad' means, only goat may pass. A 'geiss' is a female goat in local mother tongue. Smugglers used this pass in recent times too, but it was never accessible with horses or donkeys for payloads.

See also
List of mountain lakes of Switzerland

Geisspfad